The Manila worm snake (Gerrhopilus manilae) is a species of snake in the Gerrhopilidae family. It is sometimes placed in the genus Malayotyphlops.

References

Gerrhopilus
Reptiles described in 1962